Wretton is a village and civil parish in the English county of Norfolk.
For the purposes of local government, it falls within the district of King's Lynn and West Norfolk.

The villages name means 'Crosswort/hellebore farm/settlement'.

It is situated some  East of Downham Market,  South of King's Lynn and  West of Norwich.
Also  North of the larger village of Stoke Ferry.

Notes

External links 

Information from Genuki Norfolk on Wretton.
Wretton Parish Council
The Wretton category of the neighbouring Stoke Ferry Website includes Parish Council meeting minutes.

Villages in Norfolk
King's Lynn and West Norfolk
Civil parishes in Norfolk